The Gap is a suburb of the town of Alice Springs, in the Northern Territory, Australia. It is located at the Heavitree Gap.

References

Suburbs of Alice Springs